Tomo Križnar (born 26 August 1954) is a peace activist, notable for delivering video cameras in Southern Kordofan to the local ethnic Nuba civilians in order to help them collect the evidence of North Sudan military's war crimes against them. He wrote several books. He was also a special envoy of then Slovenian president Janez Drnovšek for Darfur.

Private life
Born in Jesenice, Jesenice (SR Slovenia, SFR Yugoslavia), he has lived his entire life in Naklo, northwestern Slovenia. He has graduated from economic sciences and mechanical engineering. 
Now he and his wife live in Postojna.

Peace missions

2006 Darfur mission
[[Image:Villages destroyed in the Darfur Sudan 2AUG2004.jpg|thumb|300px|right|Destroyed villages  (Source: DigitalGlobe, Inc. and Department of State via USAID)]] 

In 2006, Križnar entered the Darfur region with the help of Darfur rebels during the War in Darfur. He entered without a valid visa via the neighbouring Chad. On 20 July 2006, he was arrested. On 14 August 2006, he was convicted of "publishing false news, espionage and entering Sudan without an entry visa" and the criminal court of Al-Fashir in Northern Darfur sentenced him for two years imprisonment and a fine of 500,000 dinars (US$2,400). His photography equipment and films were confiscated.

The Slovene government urged Sudan to pardon Križnar. Then president of Slovenia, Janez Drnovšek, addressed a special letter to Omar Hasan Ahmad al-Bashir and sent another special envoy to Sudan. On 2 September 2006, al-Bashir agreed to pardon and release Tomo Križnar. Križnar returned to Slovenia on 5 September; but he had to leave photography equipment and films – that contain documentations of mass graves according to him – in Sudan.

2011 Southern Kordofan mission
In 2011, Križnar delivered video cameras in Southern Kordofan to the local ethnic Nuba civilians in order to help them collect the evidence of North Sudan military's war crimes against them.

In 2012, world premiere of the Eyes and Ears Of God – Video surveillance of Sudan film on YouTube. The documentary film shows the ethnic Nuba civilians defending themselves with the help of over 400 cameras distributed by himself and Klemen Mihelič, the founder of humanitarian organisation H.O.P.E., to volunteers across the war zones in the Nuba Mountains, Blue Nile, and Darfur, documenting the (North) Sudan military's war crimes against local populations. On his website there are quotes from media news about the "refugees in Blue Nile (...) starve highly of no food, medicine and insecurity from the continual aerial bombardment" and "starving families hiding in caves to escape bombing by Sudanese warplanes".

Documentary films
2012 Eyes and Ears Of God – Video surveillance of Sudan - available on YouTube
2008 DAR FUR - War for Water - available on YouTube
2001 Nuba, voices from the other side
2000 Nuba, pure people - available on YouTube
1995 Lonely paths

Books
Books are in Slovene only.
1999 Nuba, pure people
1996 Mana, by Bicycle among Indians
1994 Lonely paths
1993 Shambala - to Tibet by Bicycle
1990 On Search for Love or Around the World by Bicycle

See also 
Blue Nile
Paul Salopek, a (Pulitzer awarded) National Geographic and Chicago Tribune  journalist, who was like Tomo Križnar also charged with espionage, passing information illegally, writing "false news," and entering Sudan without a visa

References

Sources 
Dodging Bombers in Sudan, 22 February, 2012 report from New York Times columnist Nicholas D. Kristof
Sudan Tribune of 15 August 2006 about Tomo Križnar
Sudan Tribune of 15 August about Slovenian protests
Sudan Tribune on 16 August: Pressure on Sudanese government
Sudan Tribune of 22 August: Further developments; Križnar's arrest as warning to the international community
Sudan Tribune of 3 September: Release of Tomo Križnar
Sudan Tribune of 6 September: Tomo Križnar returns to Slovenia

External links
Tomo Kriznar - official website

1954 births
Humanitarians
Slovenian writers
Living people
Slovenian anti-war activists
People from the Municipality of Naklo
Slovenian documentary filmmakers